A Spray of Plum Blossoms is a 1931 silent Chinese film directed by Bu Wancang and starring Ruan Lingyu, Wang Cilong, Lim Cho Cho, and Jin Yan. It is a loose adaptation of William Shakespeare's The Two Gentlemen of Verona. The film is one of several collaborations between Bu Wancang and two of the top Chinese movie stars of the day Ruan Lingyu and the Korean-born Jin Yan and was produced by the Lianhua Film Company.

The film is noted for its attempted "Westernized stylings" including its surreal use of decor, as well as women-soldiers with long hair. The film also had English subtitles, but as some scholars have noted, since few foreigners watched these films, the subtitles were more to give off an air of the West rather than to serve any real purpose.

Cast
Ruan Lingyu as Hu Zhilu (Julia)
Jin Yan as Hu Luting (Valentine)
Wang Cilong as Bai Lede (Proteus)
Lim Cho Cho as Shi Luohua (Silvia)
Gao Zhanfei as Liao Di'ao (Tiburio)
Chen Yen-yen as A Qiao (Lucetta)
Liu Jiqun as Fatty Liu
Wang Guilin as General Shi
Shi Juefei as Li Yi, the chief bandit

Plot
The film tells the story of Bai Lede (Wang Chilong) and Hu Luting (Jin Yan), two military cadets who have been friends since they were children. After graduating, Hu, a playboy uninterested in love, is appointed as a captain in Guangdong and leaves his home town in Shanghai. Bai however, deeply in love with Hu's sister, Hu Zhuli (Ruan Lingyu) stays behind. At Guangdong, Hu falls in love with the local general's daughter, Shi Luohua (Lim Cho Cho), although the general, Shi (Wang Guilin), is unaware of the relationship, and instead wants his daughter to marry the foolish Liao Di'ao (Gao Zhanfei). Meanwhile, Bai's father uses his influence to get Bai posted to Guangdong, and after a sorrowful farewell between himself and Zhuli, he arrives at his new post and instantly falls in love with Luohua. In an effort to have her for himself, Bai betrays his friend, by informing General Shi of his daughter's plans to elope with Hu, leading to Shi dishonourably discharging Hu. Bai tries to win Luohua over, but she is uninterested, only concerned with lamenting the loss of Hu. In the meantime, Hu encounters a group of bandits who ask him to be their leader, to which he agrees, planning on returning for Luohua at some point in the future. Some time passes, and one day, as Luohua, Bai and Liao are passing through the forest, they are attacked. Luohua manages to flee, and Bai pursues her into the forest. They engage in an argument, but just as Bai seems about to lose his temper, Hu intervenes, and he and Luohua are reunited. General Shi arrives in time to see Liao flee the scene, and he now realises that he was wrong to get in the way of the relationship between Hu and his daughter. Hu then forgives Bai his betrayal, and Bai reveals that he has discovered that his only true love is in fact Zhuli back in Shanghai.

DVD release
A Spring of Plum Blossoms was released on all-region DVD by Cinema Epoch as a packaged disc (along with Shi Dongshan's Two Stars in the Milky Way). The disc was released on 11 September 2007.

See also
One Plum Blossom

References

External links
 
 A Spray of Plum Blossoms from the Chinese Movie Database (incorrectly referred to as The Peach Girl)
 Cinema Epoch's collection of Chinese and other foreign films

1931 films
Chinese silent films
Films based on The Two Gentlemen of Verona
Films directed by Bu Wancang
Lianhua Film Company films
Films set in Guangdong
Films set in the Republic of China (1912–1949)
Films shot in Shanghai
Films shot in Guangdong
Films shot in Hong Kong
Chinese drama films
1931 drama films
Chinese black-and-white films
Silent drama films